Torsukattak is a fjord in far southern Greenland. Administratively it is part of the Kujalleq municipality.

Geography
{ "type": "ExternalData", "service": "geoshape", "ids": "Q24727785", "properties": { "fill": "#0050d0"}}

Torsukattak Fjord is located to the southwest of Prince Christian Sound near the Cape Farewell Archipelago. The fjord is oriented in a roughly north–south direction and in the south it opens into the Labrador Sea of the North Atlantic Ocean. It separates large Pamialluk Island in the east from the mainland to the west of the fjord. Stordalen Havn is located at the bend 20 km into the fjord where it bends to the east for 7 km and connects with the Qoornoq Strait and the Ilua Fjord of the Prince Christian Sound system. 

The islands of Sullat and Nunarsuaq —the latter rising to a height of 939 m— lie at the mouth of the fjord. There are further smaller islands near them.

Bibliography
Ivar Haug (2005). Gazetteer of Greenland UBiT (Trondheim University Library),

See also
List of fjords of Greenland

References

External links
 Pictures of the Torsukattak Fjord and Pamialluk Island
 Field Report about Paleo-Eskimo Culture in South Greenland (in Danish)

Fjords of Greenland
Kujalleq